Spasoje "Paja" Samardžić (Serbian Cyrillic: Спасоје Паја Самарџић; born 20 May 1942) is a Serbian retired football winger and manager.

Playing career

International
With two games for the young team (1959) and one for the Under-21 team (1963), he capped 26 games for the best selection of Yugoslavia, scoring three goals. He debuted against East Germany (1–2) in Leipzig on 16 September 1962, then he played in the Olympic tournament in Japan.  He played his last national team game on 19 October 1966 against Czechoslovakia (0–3) in Belgrade.

Coaching career
Following his playing career, Samardžić worked as a coach for Srem Jakovo and FK Beograd. He also served as director of OFK Beograd.

Honours
OFK Beograd
 Yugoslav First League: Runner-up 1963–64
 Yugoslav Cup: 1961–62, 1965–66
Feyenoord
 Eredivisie: 1968–69
 KNVB Cup: 1968–69
 UEFA Intertoto Cup: 1967, 1968
Saint-Étienne
 Ligue 1: 1969–70
 Coupe de France: 1969–70

References

External links
 Spasoje Samardžić at reprezentacija.rs
 
 

1942 births
Living people
Sportspeople from Skenderaj
Kosovo Serbs
Serbian footballers
Yugoslav footballers
Association football forwards
Serbian football managers
OFK Beograd players
FC Twente players
Feyenoord players
AS Saint-Étienne players
Yugoslav First League players
Eredivisie players
Ligue 1 players
Yugoslavia international footballers
Olympic footballers of Yugoslavia
Footballers at the 1964 Summer Olympics
Serbian expatriate footballers
Yugoslav expatriate footballers
Expatriate footballers in the Netherlands
Yugoslav expatriate sportspeople in the Netherlands
Expatriate footballers in France
Yugoslav expatriate sportspeople in France